Burnt Fork is a stream in the U.S. state of South Dakota.

Some say Burnt Fork took its name from the local Burnt Ranch, while others believe an early forest fire caused the name to be selected.

See also
List of rivers of South Dakota

References

Rivers of Pennington County, South Dakota
Rivers of South Dakota